Miriam Forasté (born 1 March 1991) is a Spanish women's basketball player currently playing for Ros Casares Valencia in Euroleague Women and Spain's Liga Femenina.

She started playing basketball at Lluisos de Gracia. Forasté has represented Spain's junior national teams at several youth competitions.

References

External links
Profile at FIBA Europe page

1991 births
Living people
Spanish women's basketball players
Ros Casares Valencia players
Forwards (basketball)